Dubrovnik was a flotilla leader built for the Royal Yugoslav Navy by Yarrow Shipbuilders in Glasgow in 1930 and 1931. She was one of the largest destroyers of her time. Resembling contemporary British designs, Dubrovnik was a fast ship with a main armament of four Czechoslovak-built Škoda  guns in single mounts. She was intended to be the first of three flotilla leaders built for Yugoslavia, but was the only one completed. During her service with the Royal Yugoslav Navy, Dubrovnik undertook several peacetime cruises through the Mediterranean, the Turkish Straits and the Black Sea. In October 1934, she conveyed King Alexander to France for a state visit, and carried his body back to Yugoslavia following his assassination in Marseille.

During the German-led Axis invasion of Yugoslavia in April 1941, Dubrovnik was captured by the Italians. After a refit, which included the replacement of some of her weapons and the shortening of her mainmast and funnels, she was commissioned into the Royal Italian Navy as Premuda. In Italian service she was mainly used as an escort and troop transport. In June 1942, she was part of the Italian force that attacked the Allied Operation Harpoon convoy attempting to relieve the island of Malta. In July 1943, she broke down and was brought to Genoa for repair and a refit. Premuda was the most important and effective Italian war prize ship of World War II.

At the time of the Italian surrender to the Allies in September 1943, Premuda was still docked in Genoa, and was seized by Germany. Plans to convert her into a radar picket for night fighters were abandoned. In August 1944, following the replacement of her armament, she was commissioned into the German Navy as a Torpedoboot Ausland (foreign torpedo boat) with the designation TA32. The ship saw action shelling Allied positions on the Italian coast and laying naval mines. In March 1945, she took part in the Battle of the Ligurian Sea against two Royal Navy destroyers, during which she was lightly damaged. She was scuttled the following month as the Germans retreated from Genoa.

Development
Following the demise of the Austro-Hungarian Empire and the subsequent creation of the Kingdom of Serbs, Croats and Slovenes (KSCS), Austria-Hungary transferred the vessels of the former Austro-Hungarian Navy to the new nation. The Kingdom of Italy was unhappy with this, and convinced the Allies to share the Austro-Hungarian ships among the victorious powers. As a result, the only modern sea-going vessels left to the KSCS were 12 torpedo boats, and they had to build their naval forces almost from scratch.

During the 1920s, many navies were pursuing the flotilla leader concept, building large destroyers similar to the World War I Royal Navy V and W-class destroyers. In the interwar French Navy, these ships were known as contre-torpilleurs, and were intended to operate with smaller destroyers, or as half-flotillas of three ships. The idea was that such a half-flotilla could defeat an Italian light cruiser of the Condottieri class. The Navy of the KSCS decided to build three such flotilla leaders, ships that would have the ability to reach high speeds and with a long endurance. The long endurance requirement reflected Yugoslav plans to deploy the ships into the central Mediterranean, where they would be able to operate alongside French and British warships.

At the time the decision was made, French shipyards were heavily committed to producing vessels for the French Navy. So, despite its intention to develop a French concept, the KSCS engaged Yarrow Shipbuilders in Glasgow, Scotland, to build the ships. Unlike the French, who preferred to install guns of their own manufacture, Yarrow was happy to order the guns from the Czechoslovak firm Škoda. The initial Yarrow design was based on an enlarged version of the British Shakespeare class, with five Skoda 14 cm/56 naval guns. Excessive top weight resulted in the deletion of one of the guns, to be replaced with a seaplane mounting. The final version replaced the seaplane mounting with improved anti-aircraft armament.

The intention to build three flotilla leaders was demonstrated by the fact that Yarrow ordered a total of 12 Škoda  guns, four per ship. In July or August 1929, the KSCS (which became the Kingdom of Yugoslavia on 3 October) signed a contract with Yarrow for a destroyer named Dubrovnik. This was the only ship built; the Great Depression prevented the construction of the rest of the planned half-flotilla.

Description and construction
Dubrovnik was similar in many respects to the British destroyers being manufactured at the same time, having a square box-like bridge, a long forecastle, and a sharp raked stem similar to the later British Tribal class. Her rounded stern was adapted for minelaying.

Dubrovnik had two Parsons geared steam turbines, each driving a single propeller shaft. She carried  of fuel oil.

The ship's main armament consisted of four Škoda  L/56 superfiring guns in single mounts, two forward of the superstructure and two aft. She was also equipped with two triple Brotherhoods  torpedo tubes on her centreline. For air defence, Dubrovnik had twin-mounted Škoda  L/35 guns located on the centreline between the two sets of torpedo tubes, and six semi-automatic Škoda  L/67 anti-aircraft guns, arranged in two twin mounts and two single mounts. The twin mounts were located between the two funnels, with the single mounts on the main deck abreast the aft control station.  For anti-submarine work she was equipped with two depth charge throwers and two depth charge rails, and carried ten depth charges. She also carried two Česká zbrojovka  machine guns and 40 mines. Her crew comprised 20 officers and 220 ratings. She was laid down on 10 June 1930 and launched on 11 October 1931 by Princess Olga, the consort of the Prince Regent of Yugoslavia, Prince Paul. She was named after the former city-state and Yugoslav port of Dubrovnik.

Service history

Dubrovnik

Dubrovnik was completed at the Yarrow shipyards in Glasgow in 1932, by which time her main guns and light anti-aircraft guns had been installed. After sailing to the Bay of Kotor in the southern Adriatic, she was fitted with her heavy anti-aircraft guns. She was commissioned with the Royal Yugoslav Navy in May 1932. Her captain was Armin Pavić.

In late September 1933, the ship left the Bay of Kotor and sailed through the Turkish Straits to Constanța on the Black Sea coast of Bulgaria, where she embarked King Alexander and Queen Maria of Yugoslavia. She then visited Balcic in Romania and Varna in Bulgaria, before returning via Istanbul and the Greek island of Corfu in the Ionian Sea, arriving back at the Bay of Kotor on 8 October. On 6 October 1934, King Alexander left the Bay of Kotor on board Dubrovnik for a state visit to France, arriving in Marseille on 9 October. He was killed the same day by a Bulgarian assassin, and Dubrovnik conveyed his body back to Yugoslavia, escorted by French, Italian and British ships. Soon after, Vladimir Šaškijević replaced Pavić as captain. In August 1935, Dubrovnik visited Corfu and Bizerte in the French protectorate of Tunisia. In August 1937, Dubrovnik visited Istanbul and the Greek ports of Mudros in the northern Aegean Sea and Piraeus near Athens.

Despite trying to remain neutral in the early stages of the World War II, Yugoslavia was drawn into the conflict in April 1941, when it was invaded by the German-led Axis powers.

Premuda
The Italians captured Dubrovnik in the Bay of Kotor on 17 April 1941; she had been damaged by Yugoslav civilians prior to her seizure. Dubrovnik was sailed to Taranto in southern Italy on 21 May, where she underwent repairs and a refit. She was renamed Premuda, after the Dalmatian island near which an Italian motor torpedo boat had sunk the Austro-Hungarian dreadnought  in June 1918. Her aft deckhouse and emergency bridge were removed and replaced with an anti-aircraft platform, and her mainmast and funnels were shortened. Her four single mount Škoda  L/56 guns were replaced by four single mount 135 mm L/45 guns and her twin Škoda  L/55 anti-aircraft guns were replaced by a  L/15 howitzer firing star shells for illumination, while the six Škoda  L/67 anti-aircraft guns were replaced by four Breda Model 35  L/65 machine guns in single mounts, space for the latter being made available by removing her searchlights. A new director was also fitted to her bridge. Later in her Italian service, the  howitzer was replaced by a twin Breda  L/54 anti-aircraft gun mount. Under the Italian flag, her crew consisted of 13 officers and 191 enlisted ranks.

Premuda was commissioned in the Italian Navy in February 1942. In early June, the  fired on Premuda, mistaking her for a British destroyer owing to her similarities with a British H-class destroyer. The attack missed Premuda and struck the Navigatori-class destroyer , sinking her. During 12–16 June 1942, Premuda took part in operations against the Allied Operation Harpoon convoy attempting to reach the beleaguered island of Malta from Gibraltar. The Allied naval force lost two destroyers and four merchant ships to a combination of naval gunfire, torpedoes, air attacks, and naval mines. The Navigatori-class destroyer  was hit by a British destroyer, and Premuda was tasked to tow her to safety in the harbour of Pantelleria, an island in the Strait of Sicily, under escort from the destroyer .

On 6–7 January 1943, Premuda and 13 other Italian destroyers transported troops to the Axis-held port of Tunis in North Africa. They completed two more such missions between 9 February and 22 March. On 17 July, Premuda developed serious engine problems in the Ligurian Sea near La Spezia. She was subsequently brought to Genoa for a major boiler and engine overhaul. It was decided to rebuild her along the lines of the Navigatori-class, including a wider beam to improve her stability. As shells for her Škoda-built main guns were in short supply, the decision was made to replace them with Italian-made  /L45 guns in single mounts. The rebuild was also to have included augmented 37 mm and 20 mm armament, probably using space made available by removing her aft torpedo tubes. The rebuild had not been completed when Italy surrendered to the Allies, and Premuda was seized by Germany at Genoa on 8 or 9 September 1943. Premuda was the most important and effective Italian war prize ship of World War II.

TA32
Premudas new guns had not been completed when she was captured by the Germans. Their initial plans called for the ship to serve as a radar picket for night fighters, with three  L/45 anti-aircraft guns in single mounts, Freya early-warning radar, Würzburg gun-laying radar and a FuMO 21 surface fire-control system. These plans were soon abandoned because the Germans lacked destroyers and torpedo boats in the Mediterranean, and the decision was made to commission her as a Torpedoboot Ausland (foreign torpedo boat) with a DeTe radar instead of the Freya and Würzburg radar sets. Her armament was replaced with four  L/45 naval guns, eight  anti-aircraft guns and between thirty-two and thirty-six  anti-aircraft guns in quadruple and twin mounts. The number of torpedo tubes was reduced from six to three. The number of  anti-aircraft guns was later increased to ten, in four twin and two single mounts. In German service, she had a total crew of 220 officers and men.

The ship was commissioned in the German Navy on 18 August 1944, as TA32, under the command of Kapitänleutnant Emil Kopka. She served in the Ligurian Sea with the 10th Torpedo Boat Flotilla, and was immediately committed to shelling Allied positions on the Italian coast, then scouting and minelaying tasks in the western Gulf of Genoa. After exchanging fire, the three ships returned to Genoa without being hit. By mid-March 1945, TA32, TA24 and TA29 were the only ships of the 10th Torpedo Boat Flotilla that remained operational. On the night of 17/18 March 1945, TA32 placed 76 naval mines off Cap Corse, the northern tip of Corsica, in an offensive minelaying operation, along with TA24 and TA29. Outgunned, TA24 and TA29 were sunk, while TA32 managed to escape with light damage to her rudder, after firing a few rounds and making an abortive torpedo attack. TA32 was scuttled at Genoa on 24 April 1945 as the Germans retreated. Her wreck was raised and broken up in 1950.

See also
 List of ships of the Royal Yugoslav Navy

Notes

Footnotes

References

Books

Periodicals and films

External links
 Premuda Marina Militare website

1931 ships
Ships built on the River Clyde
TA032
Premuda
Destroyers of the Royal Yugoslav Navy
History of Dubrovnik
Naval ships of Italy captured by Germany during World War II
Naval ships of Yugoslavia captured by Italy during World War II
Scuttled vessels
World War II destroyers of Germany
World War II destroyers of Italy
World War II destroyers of Yugoslavia
Maritime incidents in April 1945
United Kingdom–Yugoslavia relations